Brandon Keith James (born December 21, 1987) is a former American football wide receiver and kick returner.  James played college football for the University of Florida, was a two-time All-American, and was a member of two BCS National Championship teams.  Thereafter, he played professionally for the Indianapolis Colts of the National Football League (NFL) and for the Edmonton Eskimos of the Canadian Football League (CFL).

Early years
James was born in St. Augustine, Florida in 1987.  He attended St. Augustine High School, where he was a standout running back for the St. Augustine Yellow Jackets high school football team.  As a senior team captain in 2005, James ran for 900 yards and eight touchdowns while leading the Yellow Jackets to a Florida Class 3A state championship.

College career
James received an athletic scholarship to attend the University of Florida in Gainesville, Florida, where he played for coach Urban Meyer's Florida Gators football team from 2006 to 2009.  As a freshman in 2006, James saw immediate playing time as a kick return specialist, returning 33 punts for 363 yards and one touchdown in 2006, and earning Freshman All-Southeastern Conference (SEC) and Freshman All-American honors.  His 33-yard kickoff return against the Ohio State Buckeyes in the 2007 BCS National Championship Game gave the Gators the ball in Buckeye territory after Ohio State's Ted Ginn Jr. opened the game with a kickoff return for a touchdown.  James's dramatic return and the Gators' resulting touchdown changed the early momentum of the game, with the Gators ultimately defeating the top-ranked Buckeyes 41–14 to win the BCS National Championship.

James led the Gators in kickoff and punt return yardage for four consecutive seasons, and finished his college career with 4,770 total yards gained, including 112 kickoff returns for 2,718 yards and a touchdown, 117 punt returns for 1,371 yards and four touchdowns, 379 receiving yards and 302 rushing yards.  His career kickoff return yardage and combined kick return yardage remain SEC records.  He was a first-team All-American in 2007, a consensus first-team All-American in 2008, a first-team All-SEC selection in 2008, the SEC Special Teams Player of the Year in 2008, and a senior team captain in 2009.  During his time as a Gator, the team won two SEC Championship Games (2006, 2008) and two BCS National Championship Games (2007, 2009).

James graduated from the University of Florida with a bachelor's degree in sociology in 2010.

Track and field

James was also a member of the Florida Gators track and field team, competing at the SEC Outdoor Championships.  His personal bests are 10.43 seconds in the 100 meters and 21.00 seconds in the 200 meters.

Personal bests

Professional career

The Indianapolis Colts signed James as an undrafted free agent on April 30, 2010.  On November 10, James was activated from the practice squad to the main roster.  On November 28, 2010, James posted 150 kick return yards and 29 punt return yards.  He was released the following week from the Colts active roster.

In , the Edmonton Eskimos signed James as a free agent, but he was later released during the regular season, bringing his playing career to an end.

Coaching career

In 2012, James was hired to coach the football team at St. Joseph Academy in St. Augustine. He was fired after one season in which the team went 2-8.

See also 

 2006 Florida Gators football team
 2007 College Football All-America Team
 2008 College Football All-America Team
 2008 Florida Gators football team
 List of Florida Gators football All-Americans
 List of SEC Most Valuable Players
 List of University of Florida alumni

References

Bibliography 

 Carlson, Norm, University of Florida Football Vault: The History of the Florida Gators, Whitman Publishing, LLC, Atlanta, Georgia (2007).  .

External links 
  Brandon James – Florida Gators player profile

1987 births
Living people
People from St. Augustine, Florida
Players of American football from Florida
American football return specialists
American football running backs
American football wide receivers
Florida Gators football players
All-American college football players
Indianapolis Colts players
American players of Canadian football
Edmonton Elks players
Track and field athletes from Florida
Florida Gators men's track and field athletes